Rod Laver Arena is a multipurpose arena located within Melbourne Park, in Melbourne, Victoria, Australia. The arena is the main venue for the Australian Open, the first Grand Slam tennis tournament of the calendar year.

History

Replacing the aging Kooyong Stadium, construction on the arena began in 1985. It was undertaken by Civil & Civic was completed in 1987 at a cost of AU$94 million. It opened on 11 January 1988 for the 1988 Australian Open.

Originally known in 1988 as the National Tennis Centre at Flinders Park, the arena has officially changed its name twice. First in 1996, when it was known as the Centre Court, and again on 16 January 2000 to honour Rod Laver, a three-time winner of the Australian Open and one of the world's greatest tennis players.

Features

Rod Laver Arena has a seating capacity of 14,820, with a capacity of 15,400 for sports such as basketball, when extra seats are added around the court, and up to 14,200 for concerts with floor seating. The arena currently attracts over 1.5 million visitors per year.

The arena was the first tennis venue in the world and the first arena of any kind in Australia to have a retractable roof installed. The idea for such a roof came about at the suggestion of John Cain, the premier of Victoria around 1980, who came up with the compromise idea after Tennis Australia requested the government to build an open air tennis facility next to a preexisting government project to build a closed roof entertainment center.

The Rod Laver Arena is the largest indoor arena in Australia without a permanent roof (not counting the 56,347 seat Docklands Stadium, also in Melbourne, which is classed as a stadium rather than an arena). It is also the second largest indoor arena in Australia behind the 21,032 capacity Sydney Super Dome. The arena's retractable roof allows competitors to continue play during rain or extreme heat. 

Rod Laver Arena is equipped with the Hawk-Eye electronic system which allows tennis players to challenge the umpire's decision on calls made throughout championships.

Sports and events
Rod Laver Arena is the centrepiece of the National Tennis Centre at Melbourne Park, and besides tennis, the arena has hosted basketball, motorbike super-crosses, music concerts, conferences, World Wrestling Entertainment events and ballet. Other than for tennis, during sporting events or concerts, a section of the southern lower seating bowl is retracted to allow space for a stage or special floor level seating.

Tennis
Rod Laver Arena acts as the centre court for the Australian Open tennis championships every year. The player after whom the arena is named, Rod Laver, is a frequent guest of honour at Championships and has presented the trophy to the men's singles champion on several occasions. Laver is widely considered the best player of his generation and amongst the consideration in the best players of all time.

Rod Laver Arena was the scene for Australia's famous Davis Cup victories in 2003. The arena hosted the semi-final and Final, at which Australia was successful in recording their 28th Davis Cup title.

Basketball
Aside from tennis, the sport most often held at Rod Laver Arena in the past was basketball. The arena's first basketball game was in 1991 when the Australian Boomers played host to a touring All-Star team headlined by Kareem Abdul-Jabbar, with over 15,000 in attendance.

On 3 April 1992, the arena became the home of Melbourne basketball when the Melbourne Tigers (now known as Melbourne United) defeated the Canberra Cannons 112–104. The venue was actually criticised in its early days as a basketball venue due to the poor quality of the backboards and rings used. However, these concerns were quickly addressed and the arena became known as one of the best in the country, especially with anywhere near a full house in attendance. The arena was also home to the South East Melbourne Magic (later renamed the Victoria Titans in 1998 after merging with the North Melbourne Giants) with both teams attracting some of the largest crowds in the history of the NBL. Rod Laver Arena was also the site of the first ever "outdoor" pro basketball game in Australia when the Magic hosted the Adelaide 36ers on 31 December 1997 with the roof open.

The largest basketball crowd at Rod Laver Arena was set in 1996 when 15,366 attended a local derby game between the Magic and Tigers. This remains the second largest NBL basketball attendance ever in Australia behind the 17,803 who attended a game between the Sydney Kings and West Sydney Razorbacks at the Sydney Super Dome in 1999. Game two of the 1996 NBL Grand Final series, also between the Magic and Tigers, saw the NBL's largest ever single game Grand Final crowd when 15,064 watched the Magic defeat the Tigers 88–84.

1992 saw the first time two teams from the one city had reached the NBL Grand Final series when the Magic faced fellow Melbourne Park tenants the Tigers. With all games being played at the league's largest venue a record aggregate of 43,605 (average 14,535) fans saw the Magic win their first championship two games to one, coming back to win games two and three 115–93 and 95–88 after losing game one 98–116.

In all, Rod Laver Arena hosted 287 NBL games including NBL Championship deciders in 1992, 1996, 1997 and 1999, and played host to its last game in April 2000 before Melbourne Arena opened in 2000 and became the new home of basketball in Melbourne. The arena hosted the Australian Boomers on numerous occasions, including playing against the Magic Johnson All-Stars in 1995, as well as hosting the 1997 FIBA Under-22 World Championship, which Australia won for the first time. The arena also played host to the 1993 NBL All-Star Game with the NBL Stars defeating the Boomers 124–119.

On 15 August 2015, Rod Laver Arena played host to the opening game of the 2015 FIBA Men's Oceania Basketball Championship between the Australian Boomers and the New Zealand Tall Blacks. In front of 15,062 fans Australia ran out 71–59 winners.

Swimming
Rod Laver Arena was the centrepiece of the 12th FINA World Aquatics Championships, which were held from 17 March-1 April 2007. A temporary swimming pool, named the Susie O'Neill Pool after Australian swimming champion Susie O'Neill, was built at significant cost.

Commonwealth Games
Rod Laver was the host venue for the gymnastics competition at the 2006 Commonwealth Games.

Other sports
The venue has hosted professional wrestling events such as World Wrestling Entertainment, World Championship Wrestling, World Wrestling All-Stars and World Cup skateboarding. In July 2012, the venue hosted its first netball match, when the Melbourne Vixens were forced to move a home semi-final to the arena after their usual home venue was booked for a concert. On 10 February 2019, the venue hosted UFC 234: Adesanya vs. Silva.

Esports

Rod Laver Arena was one of the host venues, along with Margaret Court Arena and Melbourne Arena, for the second Melbourne Esports Open on the weekend of 31 August to 1 September 2019. It featured three major regional esports tournaments across League of Legends, Overwatch and Rainbow Six Siege.

Concerts

Rod Laver Arena consistently hosts Melbourne's highest-profile musical and entertainment concerts. In 2009, the arena polled 9th out of 50 worldwide top arenas for first-quarter ticket sales, making it the second highest ticket selling venue in Australia, second to Sydney's Qudos Bank Arena, which placed third. In 2012, the arena became Australia's highest selling venue and 4th in the world, based on 2011 ticket sales.

Rod Laver Arena's record attendance of 16,183 was set on 18 November 2007 for a Justin Timberlake concert during his FutureSex/LoveShow tour.

American singer P!nk performed a record-breaking 18 concerts at the venue in the winter of 2013 with her Truth About Love Tour, beating her own record of 17 shows from the Funhouse Tour in 2009. She is currently the artist who holds the record for most shows at the venue.

Tennis surface

From 1988 until 2007, the surface of the court at the Australian Open and on Rod Laver Arena was Rebound Ace, which was coloured green and played slowly. The surface was also blamed for many injuries in the Australian Open, with many players claiming that the surface became sticky in hot weather, making it difficult to play on.

In 2008, the surface was changed to Plexicushion, and coloured blue. The surface is similar in properties to DecoTurf, the surface used in the US Open. This has more cushioning and more give than Rebound Ace. In 2019 the surface was changed again to Greenset, though retained its blue appearance and similarities to the Plexicushion.

It has also had a temporary grass court in use, during the 1993 Davis Cup quarterfinals, 2001 Davis Cup final and the 2003 Davis Cup final.

Refurbishment

In June 2015, it was announced that the arena would undergo a redevelopment of its exterior facade and interior customer features, such as bars and other facilities. The refurbishment constituted the main aspect of the $338 million second stage of redevelopments that occurred at the Melbourne Park precinct, which included a new pedestrian bridge linking Melbourne Park and Birrarung Marr and a new media and administration centre. Construction began in April 2016. The refurbishment included a new eastern-facing primary entrance, an expanded public concourse space and other amenities designed to "open up" the arena and provide enhanced facilities and entry points for spectators. A new four-level Player Pod was constructed which increased the space for training, treatment, recovery, dining and lounging for athletes at major tournaments such as the Australian Open. In addition, the venue's roof was upgraded to allow for it to be closed for inclement weather in five minutes, dropping from the 30 minutes it took beforehand. The refurbishment was completed in late December 2018.

Naming
National Tennis Centre at Flinders Park (11 January 1988 – 28 January 1996)
Centre Court (29 January 1996 – 15 January 2000)
Rod Laver Arena (16 January 2000 – present)

Record attendances

Concert
16,183 – Justin Timberlake, 18 November 2007

Basketball
National Basketball League
15,366 – South East Melbourne Magic vs Melbourne Tigers, 22 June 1996
International
15,062 – Australia vs New Zealand, 15 August 2015

Tennis
14,820 – Australian Open / Davis Cup (various)

See also

List of sports venues named after individuals
List of tennis stadiums by capacity
List of indoor arenas in Australia

Notes

References

External links

Peddle Thorp Melbourne
30 Years of Rod Laver Arena Documentary – YouTube

Sports venues in Melbourne
Tennis venues in Australia
Music venues in Melbourne
Retractable-roof stadiums in Australia
2006 Commonwealth Games venues
Indoor arenas in Australia
Sports venues completed in 1988
Defunct National Basketball League (Australia) venues
Basketball venues in Australia
Boxing venues in Australia
Melbourne United
South East Melbourne Magic
Philip Cox buildings
1988 establishments in Australia
2001 Davis Cup
Buildings and structures in the City of Melbourne (LGA)
Sport in the City of Melbourne (LGA)
John Cain